Tommaso Cancellotti (born 22 May 1992) is an Italian footballer who plays as a defender for Pescara.

Career
Born in Gubbio, Umbria, Cancellotti started his career at Gubbio. In June 2009 he joined U.C. Sampdoria for €45,000. In July 2011 Cancellotti and Alberto Masi were farmed to Pro Vercelli in co-ownership deal for a peppercorn of €500 each. Cancellotti followed the club promoted to 2012–13 Serie B. On 25 January 2013 Cancellotti returned to Gubbio.

Cancellotti made his Serie B debut on 15 September 2012 against Sassuolo.

On 18 July 2019, he signed a 2-year contract with Teramo.

On 28 September 2020 he moved to Perugia.

On 4 August 2021, he joined Pescara.

References

External links
 AIC profile (data by football.it) 

1992 births
People from Gubbio
Sportspeople from the Province of Perugia
Living people
Italian footballers
Association football defenders
A.S. Gubbio 1910 players
U.C. Sampdoria players
U.S. Sestese Calcio players
F.C. Pro Vercelli 1892 players
S.S. Juve Stabia players
Brescia Calcio players
A.S. Cittadella players
S.S. Teramo Calcio players
A.C. Perugia Calcio players
Delfino Pescara 1936 players
Serie B players
Serie C players
Serie D players
Footballers from Umbria